Results and statistics for the Australian Lacrosse League season of 2007.

Game 22 
Saturday, 20 October 2007, Melbourne, Victoria

Goalscorers:
Vic: Nick LeGuen 4-1, Jake Egan 2, Blair Pepperell 2, Clinton Lander 0-1, John Tokarua 0-1.
SA: Anson Carter 3, Leigh Perham 1-3, Wes Green 1, Stefan Guerin 1, Brock Pettigrove 1.

Game 23 
Sunday, 21 October 2007, Melbourne, Victoria

Goalscorers:
Vic: Nick LeGuen 3-2, Blair Pepperell 2, Andrew Whitbourn 2, Clinton Lander 1-2, Sam Bullock 1-1, Jake Egan 1, Adam Townley 1, Ben Waite 1, Aaron Onofretchook 0-2, Alistair Gloutnay 0-1.
SA: Kieren Lennox 2, Will Pickett 2, Leigh Perham 1-3, Chris Averay 1-1, Anson Carter 1-1, Ryan Gaspari 1, Stefan Guerin 1, Brock Pettigrove 1.

Game 24 
Friday, 26 October 2007, Adelaide, South Australia

Goalscorers:
SA: Chris Averay 2-2, Anson Carter 2-1, Leigh Perham 1-1, Stefan Guerin 1, Kieren Lennox 1, Jason MacKinnon 1, Brock Pettigrove 1, Will Pickett 1, Ryan Stone 1.
WA: Wayne Curran 6, Kim Delfs 3-1, Jesse Stack 1-2, Jason Battaglia 1, Blair Coggan 1, Brad Goddard 1, James Watson-Galbraith 1, Mark Whiteman 0-1.

Game 25 
Saturday, 27 October 2007, Adelaide, South Australia

Goalscorers:
SA: Anson Carter 4, Leigh Perham 3, Chris Averay 1-2, Ryan Gaspari 1, Jack Woodford 0-1.
WA: Kim Delfs 4-3, Jesse Stack 4-1, Brad Goddard 3, Wayne Curran 2-1, Adam Delfs 1, Ben Tippett 1, James Watson-Galbraith 0-2, Mark Whiteman 0-1.

Game 26 
Friday, 2 November 2007, Perth, Western Australia

Goalscorers:
WA: Wayne Curran 2, Brad Goddard 1, Jesse Stack 0-1.
Vic: Sam Bullock 3, Ben Waite 3, Adam Townley 2, Jake Egan 1, Nick LeGuen 1, Aaron Onofretchook 1, Clinton Lander 0-2, Blair Pepperell 0-2.

Game 27 
Saturday, 3 November 2007, Perth, Western Australia

Goalscorers:
WA: Wayne Curran 2, Kim Delfs 2, Jason Battaglia 1, Ian Berry 1, James Watson-Galbraith 1, Sam Ramsay 0-1.
Vic: Adam Townley 4, Ben Waite 3, Nick LeGuen 2, Jake Egan 1, James Lawerson 1, Aaron Onofretchook 1, Andrew Whitbourn 1, Clinton Lander 0-1, Blair Pepperell 0-1.

ALL Table 2007 
Table after completion of round-robin tournament

FINAL (Game 28) 
Saturday, 10 November 2007, Melbourne, Victoria

Goalscorers:
Vic: Adam Townley 4, Nick LeGuen 2-2, Clinton Lander 2-1, Aaron Onofretchook 1-1, Andrew Whitbourn 1-1, Jake Egan 1, Ben Waite 1, Blair Pepperell 0-1.
WA: Wayne Curran 1, Kim Delfs 1, James Watson-Galbraith 1, Mark Whiteman 0-1.

All-Stars 
 ALL 2007 Champions (Garland McHarg Trophy): Victoria
 ALL 2007 Most Valuable Player (Hobbs Perpetual Trophy): Leigh Perham (SA)
 ALL 2007 All-Stars: Sam Bullock, Nick LeGuen, Cameron Shepherd, Chris Tillotson, John Tokarua, Ben Waite (Vic), Wayne Curran, Kim Delfs, Brad Goddard, Tim Kennedy, Gavin Leavy (WA), Anson Carter, Leigh Perham (SA). Coach: Murray Keen (Vic). Referee: Jason Lawrence.

See also 
Australian Lacrosse League
Lacrosse in Australia

External links 
 Australian Lacrosse League
 Lacrosse Australia
 Lacrosse South Australia
 Lacrosse Victoria
 Western Australian Lacrosse Association

Australian Lacrosse League
2007 in Australian sport
2007 in lacrosse